Elgin is a city in Union County, Oregon, United States. The population was 1,711 at the 2010 census. The community is named after the Lady Elgin, a ship lost on Lake Michigan.

The city is known for the Elgin Opera House, originally dedicated in 1912.

History 
Elgin was settled by hunters, trappers, and people of all ethnic groups. Very rarely did they make the treacherous travels from nearby La Grande, because it was 120 miles away by river through the valley, which back then was covered in thick forest. (Today, La Grande and Elgin are only 20 miles away via Wallowa Lake Highway). Elgin was the gathering place for trappers and hunters to replenish their supplies. This is how Elgin became the "Elgin Huskies". Many settlers emigrated from Walla Walla across the mountains on dog sleds. Mr. Mckinnis and his family were the first settlers.  He brought cattle from Illinois and moved to what was the outskirts of Elgin, and built one of the first homes. Even though his home is not set in the history in Elgin there is a letter from his wife's sister attesting to this fact. Mr. McKinnis built the mills from Elgin to La Grande and also owned all the century farms in the valley passing them down to his kin in death. He also worked in the first bank in Elgin before they moved to La Grande. Mr. McKinnis stated that this home was built in 1864.            

The area of Elgin was previously called "Fish Trap" and "Indian Valley." The city was platted in 1886 following the washout of Ruckles Road over the Blue Mountains, which caused investors to leave nearby Summerville for Elgin.

By 1887 Elgin had general stores, a livery, a hotel, and a church, as well as a nearby sawmill, which continues as a more modern Boise Cascade mill. Between 1887 and 1908, the area around Elgin had 35 sawmills, most transportable water-driven whipsaws (vertical reciprocating saws). Local landowners would sell the trees for 50 cents per thousand board feet, which is about how much the sawmills could handle in a day. At the time, log transportation cost about two dollars per thousand board feet, and a mill could sell the processed lumber for $6–10 per thousand board feet.

Growth increased with the arrival of the railroad in 1890, and Elgin was incorporated by the Oregon Legislative Assembly on February 18, 1891.

Geography

Elgin is at the junction of Oregon Route 82 and Oregon Route 204.

By coincidence, if you were to extend Main Street, U.S.A. from Disneyland a distance of 810 miles absolutely due north, it would land in the middle of Elgin.  Very few populated places north of Southern California are on this line.  The alignment in Elgin is between 9th Avenue and 10th Street.  This brings Elgin's actual turn-of-the-century Opera House into very close alignment with Disneyland's 1955 representation of a turn-of-the-century, small town Opera House.  Fittingly, Main Street, U.S.A. is Disneyland's depiction of small town America.

Climate
This region experiences warm (but not hot) and dry summers, with no average monthly temperatures above .  According to the Köppen Climate Classification system, Elgin has a warm-summer Mediterranean climate, abbreviated "Csb" on climate maps.

Demographics

2010 census
As of the census of 2010, there were 1,711 people, 714 households, and 482 families residing in the city. The racial makeup of the city was 95.3% White, 0.2% African American, 1.3% Native American, 0.2% Asian, 0.6% Pacific Islander, 1.2% from other races, and 1.3% from two or more races. Hispanic or Latino of any race were 3.3% of the population.

There were 714 households, of which 31.4% had children under the age of 18 living with them, 51.5% were married couples living together, 10.4% had a female householder with no husband present, 5.6% had a male householder with no wife present, and 32.5% were non-families. 27.3% of all households were made up of individuals, and 8.9% had someone living alone who was 65 years of age or older. The average household size was 2.40 and the average family size was 2.85.

The median age in the city was 43.9 years. 24.1% of residents were under the age of 18; 5.6% were between the ages of 18 and 24; 21.9% were from 25 to 44; 30.4% were from 45 to 64; and 17.8% were 65 years of age or older. The gender makeup of the city was 51.4% male and 48.6% female.

2000 census
As of the census of 2000, there were 1,654 people, 638 households, and 444 families residing in the city. The population density was 1,675.9 people per square mile (645.1/km2). There were 699 housing units at an average density of 708.3 per square mile (272.6/km2). The racial makeup of the city was 97.16% White, 0.06% African American, 0.73% Native American, 0.06% Asian, 0.36% Pacific Islander, 1.03% from other races, and 0.60% from two or more races. Hispanic or Latino of any race were 1.33% of the population.

There were 638 households, out of which 31.8% had children under the age of 18 living with them, 55.5% were married couples living together, 11.4% had a female householder with no husband present, and 30.4% were non-families. 23.5% of all households were made up of individuals, and 10.7% had someone living alone who was 65 years of age or older. The average household size was 2.58 and the average family size was 3.06.

In the city, the population was spread out, with 28.4% under the age of 18, 7.6% from 18 to 24, 25.2% from 25 to 44, 23.8% from 45 to 64, and 15.1% who were 65 years of age or older. The median age was 36 years. For every 100 females, there were 98.3 males. For every 100 females age 18 and over, there were 94.3 males.

The median income for a household in the city was $31,449, and the median income for a family was $35,529. Males had a median income of $31,250 versus $17,500 for females. The per capita income for the city was $14,861. About 8.8% of families and 14.2% of the population were below the poverty line, including 22.5% of those under age 18 and 9.3% of those age 65 or over.

Notable people 

Earl Avery Thompson,  inventor of the manual transmission synchronizer in 1923 and leader of the team at General Motors Corporation that developed the first Hydramatic automatic transmission in 1940.
Byron "By" Speece, major league baseball player, 1924 World Series Champions playing for the Washington Senators.

References

External links

 Entry for Elgin in the Oregon Blue Book
  Elgin history

Cities in Oregon
Cities in Union County, Oregon
1886 establishments in Oregon
Populated places established in 1886